Antoine Chbeir (born 12 January 1961 in Ghosta, Mount Lebanon Governorate, Lebanon) is the current bishop of the Maronite Catholic Eparchy of Latakia.

Life
Antoine Chbeir received on 13 June 1988 the sacrament of ordination. The decision of the 14th Synod of Bishops of the Maronite Church on 10 March 2015 convenes to elected him Bishop of Latakia. Pope Francis approved his election as Bishop of Latakia on 14 March 2015.

On 18 April 2015 Chbeir was ordained bishop by the hands of Maronite Patriarch of Antioch, Béchara Boutros Raï, OMM. His co-consecrators were Antoine Nabil Andari, Titular bishop of Tarsus of Maronites and Joseph Soueif, bishop of Cyprus.

Sources
http://press.vatican.va/content/salastampa/it/bollettino/pubblico/2015/03/14/0190/00425.html#Rev.do%20Corepiscopo%20Antoine%20Chbeir, Daily Bulletin, Holy See Press Office, 14 March 2015, accessed on 14 March 2015 (in Italian).

References

External links

 http://www.catholic-hierarchy.org/bishop/bchbeir.html

1961 births
21st-century Maronite Catholic bishops
Lebanese Maronites
Living people